Lucille Lund (June 3, 1913 – February 15, 2002) was an American actress. She is best known for her role in the film The Black Cat (1934).

Background
Lucille Lund was born in Buckley, Washington to Olaf Sylfestson Lund (1888–1940) and Laura (Skjelkvåle) Lund (1885–1972), who were immigrants from Oppland, Norway. She began her theatrical career as a child doing play extracts and readings. After leaving school she joined Henry Duffy Players, a stock company and toured up and down the Pacific Coast. She then studied drama at Northwestern University in Chicago.

Career
In 1933 she won a nationwide contest, "The Most Beautiful College Coed", which included a small Universal Pictures contract as a prize. Her first film was Horseplay in 1933, in which she had a minor role, with her first noticeable film being opposite Robert Young in the 1933 movie Saturday's Millions. In 1934 she starred in six films. That year she starred in The Black Cat, a horror film starring Boris Karloff and Bela Lugosi. She also starred in the lead role opposite Reb Russell in Range Warfare, and would be named a "WAMPAS Baby Star". Of the thirteen girls selected that year to be "WAMPAS Baby Stars", only four would see any success as actresses. It was the last year that "WAMPAS" selected actresses for that title. Lund had roles in 21 films from 1935 through 1939, many of which were B-movies, such as Prison Shadows. Of her last four films, she was uncredited in three.

Filmography

(Per AFI database)

 Horseplay (1933) - Iris Marley
 Fighting Through (1934) - Lucille
 Kiss and Make-Up (1934) - Magda
 Young and Beautiful (1934) 
 The Black Cat (1934) - Karen
 Folies Bergère de Paris (1935) - Girl in bar
 Timber War (1935) - Sally Martin
 Range Warfare (1935) - Little Feather
 Broadway Melody of 1936 (1935) - Showgirl
 Prison Shadows (1936) - Claire Thomas
 Rio Grande Romance (1936) - Rose Carter
 The Cowboy Star (1936) - Mother
 Panic on the Air (1936) - Cigarette girl
 Don't Get Personal (1936) - Bridesmaid
 It Happened in Hollywood (1936) - American girl
 The Devil is Driving (1937) - Dolly
 Blake of Scotland Yard (1937) - The Duchess
 A Fight to the Finish (1937) - Mabel
 What Price Vengeance (1937) - Babe Foster
 Start Cheering (1938) - Flossie
 There's That Woman Again (1938) - Receptionist

Later years
In 1937, she married Kenneth Higgins (1937–1973), a radio producer-writer. They were the parents of two daughters. In 1939, she ended her acting career after the birth of her two daughters. After the death of her husband in 1973, she returned to acting in commercials. In 1997 she took part in the documentary Lugosi: Hollywood's Dracula, about the life and career of Bela Lugosi. In 2000 Lund took part in the documentary I Used to be in Pictures, which featured many actresses from the early years of Hollywood, which included Beverly Roberts, Muriel Evans and Miriam Seegar, in addition to Lund and others. The documentary searched into Hollywood's early beginnings, and its pioneers. It would be Lund's last on-camera work. She died at her home in Rolling Hills, California in 2002, aged 88.

References

External links

 
 
Lucille Lund (Northwestern University)
 

Actresses from Washington (state)
American film actresses
1913 births
2002 deaths
People from Buckley, Washington
American people of Norwegian descent
WAMPAS Baby Stars
20th-century American actresses